Oregon is an unincorporated community in Holmes County, Mississippi, United States.

Oregon Church and Cemetery are located there.

References

Former populated places in Holmes County, Mississippi
Former populated places in Mississippi